In mathematics, a -space is a topological space that satisfies a certain a basic selection principle. 
An infinite cover of a topological space is an -cover if every finite subset of this space is contained in some member of the cover, and the whole space is not a member the cover. A cover of a topological space is a -cover if every point of this space belongs to all but finitely many members of this cover.
A -space is a space in which every open -cover contains a -cover.

History 
Gerlits and Nagy introduced the notion of γ-spaces. They listed some topological properties and enumerated them by Greek letters. The above property was the third one on this list, and therefore it is called the γ-property.

Characterizations

Combinatorial characterization 
Let  be the set of all infinite subsets of the set of natural numbers. Every set we identify with its increasing enumeration, and thus the set  we can treat as a member of the Baire space . Therefore, is a topological space as a subspace of the Baire space . A zero-dimensional separable metric space is a γ-space if and only if every continuous image of that space into the space that is centered has a pseudointersection.

Topological game characterization 
Let  be a topological space.

Bob chooses a set .

Bob chooses a set .

etc.

If  is a -cover of the space , then Bob wins the game. Otherwise, Alice wins.

A player has a winning strategy if he knows how to play in order to win the game (formally, a winning strategy is a function).

A topological space is a -space iff Alice has no winning strategy in the -game played on this space.

Properties 
 A topological space is a γ-space if and only if it satisfies  selection principle.
 Every Lindelöf space of cardinality less than the pseudointersection number  is a -space.
 Every -space is a Rothberger space,  and thus it has strong measure zero.

 Let  be a  Tychonoff space, and  be  the space of continuous functions  with pointwise convergence topology. The space  is a -space if and only if  is Fréchet–Urysohn  if and only if  is strong Fréchet–Urysohn.
 Let  be a  subset of the real line, and  be a meager subset of the real line. Then the set  is meager.

References 

General topology